Brodie Mai Chapman (born 9 April 1991) is an Australian road cyclist, who currently rides for UCI Women's WorldTeam Trek-Segafredo.

Cycling career
Chapman competed in mountain bike events before transitioning to road racing. Sixth place at the Australian National Road Championships in 2018 led to her selection for the Herald Sun Tour. She won the first stage and the overall at the Herald Sun Tour. After this victory she joined  for the 2018 season. In 2019 Chapman won two stages, the Queen of the Mountains jersey and overall victory at the Tour of the Gila.

Chapman joined the French team  at the start of the 2020 season. She started the 2020 season with victory in the inaugural edition of Race Torquay.

Major results

2016
 2nd Overall Tour of the South West
1st Stage 3
 3rd Baw Baw Classic
 5th Overall Battle on the Border
2017
 2nd Giro Della Donna
 6th Overall Tour of East Gippsland
 7th Subaru Australian Open Criterium
 10th Shimano Super Criterium
2018
 1st  Overall Herald Sun Tour
1st  Mountains classification
1st Stage 1
 5th Overall Tour of California
2019
 1st  Overall Tour of the Gila
1st Stages 1 & 5
 1st Gravel and Tar
 3rd Overall Herald Sun Tour
 6th Cadel Evans Great Ocean Road Race
2020
 1st Race Torquay
2022
 1st Grand Prix Féminin de Chambéry
 9th Tour of Flanders
2023
 1st  Road race, National Road Championships

References

External links

Living people
1991 births
Australian Institute of Sport cyclists
Australian female cyclists